Euphaedra alternus is a butterfly in the family Nymphalidae. It is found in the Democratic Republic of the Congo.

References

Butterflies described in 1935
alternus
Endemic fauna of the Democratic Republic of the Congo
Butterflies of Africa